Daphnella casta is a species of sea snail, a marine gastropod mollusc in the family Raphitomidae.

Description
The length of the shell is up to 13.5 mm.

The glassy shell is spirally grooved. The columella is twisted. The color is faintly tinged with pink.

Distribution
This marine species occurs in the Pacific Ocean off Costa Rica.

References

 Hinds R. B. (1844-1845). Mollusca. In: The zoology of the voyage of H. M. S. "Sulphur", under the command of Captain Sir Edward Belcher, R. N., C. B., F. R. G. S., etc., during the years 1836-42. London: Smith, Elder and Co. v + 72 pp., 21 pls

External links
 Gastropods.com: Daphnella canaliculata

casta
Gastropods described in 1844